Gulistan (Urdu,) is a town of Sahiwal District in the Punjab province of Pakistan. It is located at 30°29'0N 72°43'0E with an altitude of 159 metres (524 feet). Neighbouring settlements include Agra and Chandol.
Engineer Sajjad Haider Waraich, an influential person of Lahore belong to this village and his wife Dr. Muqaddas Sajjad Waraich are famous for their social work.

References

Populated places in Sahiwal District